Mutahi is a name of Kenyan origin that may refer to:

Mutahi Kagwe (born 1958), Kenyan politician and Senator for Nyeri County
Mikkel Mutahi Bischoff (born 1982), Danish footballer of Kenyan descent
Sammy Alex Mutahi (born 1989), Kenyan long-distance track runner
Wahome Mutahi (1954–2003), Kenyan humorist and playwright

See also
Mutai (name), a similar Kenyan name

Kenyan names